Jean-Philippe Belloc is a racecar driver from France. He was born in Montauban, on 24 April 1970.

Belloc started racing in single-seaters and won the French Formula Renault Championship in 1992, at his second attempt, after four wins. Moving up to the French Formula Three Championship in 1993, he took the title the following year with five wins. He raced in Formula 3000 until 1997.

After a few seasons with occasional races in the French Porsche Carrera Cup, he became a full-time sports car racing driver in 1998, when he was third in the Carrera Cup. The following year he became a Chrysler works driver, in the Oreca Chrysler Viper GTS-R, and took third place in the FIA GT Championship, also racing in the American Le Mans Series. In 2001 he became FIA GT Champion, also winning the Spa 24 Hours.

From 2002, Belloc raced mainly in the ALMS, for Carsport America, but also took part in the French Supertouring Championship, FIA Sportscar Championship and FIA GT Championship. In 2006 he drove occasionally in the FIA GT, ALMS and Le Mans Series, where he took an LMP2 class win at the 1000 km Istanbul. For 2007 he drove an Oreca Saleen S7-R in the 24 Hours of Le Mans.

24 Hours of Le Mans results

References

French racing drivers
FIA GT Championship drivers
24 Hours of Le Mans drivers
French Formula Three Championship drivers
Indy Lights drivers
Living people
International Formula 3000 drivers
American Le Mans Series drivers
European Le Mans Series drivers
FIA World Endurance Championship drivers
International GT Open drivers
24 Hours of Spa drivers
Year of birth missing (living people)

Oreca drivers
La Filière drivers
Larbre Compétition drivers
Durango drivers
DAMS drivers
24H Series drivers